The coat of arms of French Guiana, a région of France located in South America, consists of a boat full of gold on a green river, charged with three white water lilies. In chief, the fleurs-de-lis of France appear beneath the date 1643. On either side of the shield is an anteater.

The gold-laden boat references the richness of the region, while 1643 is the year in which French colonists founded the city of Cayenne. The Latin motto above the shield, Fert Aurum Industria, translates to "Work Creates Abundance".

Logo

The local government also uses a logo depicting the silhouette of the French Guiana map and four arrows that reference the Maroon people.

See also 
Flag of French Guiana

References

French Guianan culture
French Guiana
French Guiana
French Guiana
French Guiana
French Guiana